São Benedito do Sul is a city located in the state of Pernambuco, Brazil. It is located  172.5 km away from Recife, the capital of the state of Pernambuco. It has an estimated (IBGE 2020) population of 16,069 inhabitants.

Geography
 State - Pernambuco
 Region - Zona da mata Pernambucana
 Boundaries - Lagoa dos Gatos   (N);  Alagoas state    (S);  Maraial and Jaqueira   (E);  Quipapá and Panelas    (W)
 Area - 156.78 km2
 Elevation - 474 m
 Hydrography - Una River
 Vegetation - Subperenifólia forest
 Climate - Hot tropical and humid
 Annual average temperature - 22.9 c
 Distance to Recife - 172.5 km

Economy
The main economic activities in São Benedito do Sul are based in agribusiness, especially sugarcane, bananas; and livestock such as cattle and chickens.

Economic indicators

Economy by Sector
2006

Health indicators

References

Municipalities in Pernambuco